Dewanatron is a family of experimental electronic instruments.

Cousins Brian Dewan and Leon Dewan collaborate on the creation and performance of these instruments. The instruments have been performed and exhibited at the Pierogi 2000 gallery in Brooklyn in January 2006, Pierogi Leipzig (Germany) from April thru July 2006 and at ANOTHER YEAR IN LA gallery as well as The Steve Allen Theater in Los Angeles in August/September, 2007 and May 31, 2009 at the Ghetto Gloss Gallery.

Dewanatron instruments 
 Swarmatron
 Novitiate — a one-of-a-kind educational instrument designed for the Bob Moog Foundation

References 
 The arts online – Times Online
 Art in Review; Brian Dewan and Leon Dewan – New York Times
 ArtSlant – August 20th – August 23rd, Another Year in LA, Brian Dewan, Leon Dewan

External links

Dewanatron site that describes these musical inventions
Artocratic Magazine provides an in-depth interview of Leon and Brian Dewan about the theory behind the instruments, their history, and their creative and technological influences with audio and video samples.
Images of Dewanatron performing live at radio station WNYC

Electronic musical instruments
Experimental musical instruments